James Dexter Ledbetter House is a historic home located near Forest City, Rutherford County, North Carolina.  It built in 1914, and is a -story, three bay, double pile frame dwelling with Classical Revival and Colonial Revival style design elements.  It sits on a low brick foundation and has a hipped roof.  The front facade features a two-story engaged portico supported by Tuscan order columns, with a one-story wraparound section also supported by Tuscan columns.

It was added to the National Register of Historic Places in 1982.

References

Forest City, North Carolina
Houses on the National Register of Historic Places in North Carolina
Colonial Revival architecture in North Carolina
Neoclassical architecture in North Carolina
Houses completed in 1914
Houses in Rutherford County, North Carolina
National Register of Historic Places in Rutherford County, North Carolina